Streptoloma is a genus of flowering plants belonging to the family Brassicaceae.

Its native range is Iran to Central Asia and Afghanistan.

Species:

Streptoloma desertorum 
Streptoloma sumbarense

References

Brassicaceae
Brassicaceae genera
Taxa named by Alexander von Bunge